Sir George Downing, 3rd Baronet   (baptised 24 October 1685 – 10 June 1749) was a British landowner and initially Tory, but later Whig politician who sat in the House of Commons between 1710 and 1749. Through a donation in his will, he was the founder of Downing College, Cambridge.

Biography

Downing was the only son of Sir George Downing, 2nd Baronet, and his wife, Lady Catharine Cecil, daughter of James Cecil, 3rd Earl of Salisbury. His grandfather, who was created a baronet in 1663, was the namesake of Downing Street.

Lady Catharine died in 1688, and, as her husband was apparently considered an unsuitable parent, the young George was brought up in the family of his maternal aunt, Lady Mary Cecil Forester, the wife of Sir William Forester of Dothill Park, in Wellington, Shropshire. In 1700, aged 15, "by procurement and persuasion of those in whose keeping he was", he married his 13-year-old cousin, Sir William's daughter, Mary, who ultimately died childless in 1734. Between his marriage and 1704 he travelled in Europe, mainly Holland, Germany, Denmark and Italy. While George was away, Mary went against George's explicit demand that she should not accept a place at court, when she became a Maid of Honour to Queen Anne. On George's return, it was apparent that the marriage had broken down. The couple agreed a financial settlement only in 1715, whereupon Mary petitioned the House of Lords to have the marriage dissolved because of non-consummation. The petition was refused and they remained married. They jointly petitioned again in 1717, asking for a separation, which was granted. That made them legally independent, with no responsibility to one another. However, neither could remarry, and neither could have a legitimate heir.

He was a Member of Parliament for the pocket borough of Dunwich, Suffolk in the parliaments of 1710 and 1713. He lost the 1715 election but, with the aid of a 99-year lease from George I for the borough, regained the seat in 1722. He held the seat from that time until his death.

He was an uninspiring politician, but remained loyal to the ministries of Robert Walpole and subsequently Henry Pelham. In 1732, as a result of his loyalty, he was created a Knight Companion of the Order of the Bath.

Downing succeeded to his father's baronetcy and estates in 1711. He built a grand family seat in Gamlingay Park in Cambridgeshire.

Death and estate
Upon his own death, aged 63, in 1749, his title passed to his cousin, Sir Jacob Downing, 4th Baronet, with his will providing that if his line should die out, his fortune and Gamlingay estate should be used to found a college at Cambridge University. Sir Jacob Downing died childless in 1764, but his widow, Lady Margaret Downing, argued that George Downing's fortune should pass to her. This case was tied up in litigation for decades at considerable expense before the courts finally ordered that the estate should be used to found a college at Cambridge, which occurred with the founding of Downing College, Cambridge in 1800. Lady Margaret then had the Downing mansion demolished in 1776.

References

1685 births
1749 deaths
Baronets in the Baronetage of England
British MPs 1710–1713
British MPs 1713–1715
British MPs 1722–1727
British MPs 1727–1734
British MPs 1734–1741
British MPs 1741–1747
British MPs 1747–1754
Knights Companion of the Order of the Bath
Members of the Parliament of Great Britain for English constituencies
People from South Cambridgeshire District